The Royal Star and Garter Home on Richmond Hill, in Richmond, London, was built between 1921 and 1924 to a design by Sir Edwin Cooper, based on a plan produced by Sir Giles Gilbert Scott in 1915,  to provide accommodation and nursing facilities for 180 seriously injured servicemen.

The Royal Star & Garter Homes, the charitable trust running the home, announced in 2011 that it would be selling the building as it did not now meet modern requirements and could not be easily or economically upgraded. The building, which is Grade II listed, was sold in April 2013 for £50 million to a housing developer, London Square, which has restored and converted the building into apartments.

The trust opened a new 60-room home in Solihull in the West Midlands in 2008 and the remaining residents at the Richmond home moved in 2013 to a new purpose-built 63-room building in Upper Brighton Road, Surbiton, in the Royal Borough of Kingston upon Thames. A third home has now opened in High Wycombe, Buckinghamshire. The possibility of opening a fourth home is also under consideration, and funds have been set aside for this purpose.

History

The site is the location of the former Star and Garter Hotel, which closed in 1906. The building was used as a military hospital, known as the Star and Garter Home for Disabled Sailors and Soldiers, during World War I.

The site was then donated to Queen Mary (consort of George V) in support of her plans to establish a home for paralysed and permanently disabled soldiers. The hotel banqueting hall and ballroom were temporarily used to house disabled soldiers, but they were found to be unsuitable for their specialised needs. Demolition of the hotel buildings commenced in 1919 and from 1920 to 1924 the home's residents were transferred to Sandgate, Kent, while the new Star and Garter Home for Disabled Sailors, Soldiers and Airmen was built on the site of the hotel. The new building was dedicated in 1924 as the Women of the Empire's Memorial of the Great War. It was formally opened by George V and Queen Mary on 10 July 1924.

In 1948 residents of the home took part in a forerunner of the Paralympic Games, the first national athletic event for disabled athletes, organised by Dr Ludwig Guttmann.

The Star and Garter Home received its royal charter in 1979, adding the prefix "Royal" to its name. Since the opening of the second home at Solihull in 2008 the charity has used a plural form of the name, as "The Royal Star & Garter Homes".

Some of the residents who died at the home were buried in one of two dedicated sections in the nearby Richmond Cemetery. The cemetery contains two plots dedicated to deceased residents from the home, one of which is marked by the Bromhead Memorial, a large classical-style monument listing the names of those not commemorated elsewhere.

Notable residents
Notable residents have included:
Frederick Jeremiah Edwards (1894–1964), an Irish recipient of the Victoria Cross, who died at the home on 9 March 1964
Norman "Bill" Jewell (1913–2004), commander of the submarine  during Operation Mincemeat. In 1998, he suffered a serious fall and was paralysed from the neck down. He then went to live at the home until his death on 18 August 2004 aged 90.
 Major David Mills (1918–1993), Secretary General of the All England Lawn Tennis and Croquet Club 1963–1979
Nancy Wake (1912–2011), who fought with the French Resistance and lived in the home from 2003 until her death. She died on 7 August 2011, aged 98, at Kingston Hospital after being admitted with a chest infection.

Notable chairmen of the Home
Admiral Sir Barry Domvile, 1932–1934
Admiral of the Fleet Sir Caspar John, 1967–1972
General Sir Charles Harington, 1972–1980
Marshal of the RAF Sir Denis Spotswood, 1981–1985

See also
Bromhead Memorial, denoting a plot in Richmond Cemetery in which deceased residents of the Royal Star and Garter Home are buried
John Burn, honorary anaesthetist at the Star and Garter Home
 W. S. C. Copeman, consultant rheumatologist
Wick House, Richmond Hill, which, from 1950, accommodated up to 20 nurses from the Royal Star and Garter Home

References

External links
 The Royal Star & Garter Homes: official website
 Lost Hospitals of London: Royal Star and Garter Home
 Whyte, Catherine. "Tactical Retreat: The Royal Star & Garter", The Barnes Magazine, April 2013

Further reading
 

1924 establishments in England
Buildings and structures completed in 1924
Buildings and structures on the River Thames
Grade II listed buildings in the London Borough of Richmond upon Thames
Mary of Teck
Nursing homes in the United Kingdom
Richmond, London